{{Infobox drug
| Verifiedfields = changed
| verifiedrevid = 460018795
| IUPAC_name = cis-diammine(cyclobutane-1,1-dicarboxylate-O,O)platinum(II)
| image = Carboplatin-skeletal.svg
| image2 = Carboplatin-from-xtal-view-1-Mercury-3D-balls.png

| tradename = Paraplatin, others
| pronounce = 
| synonyms =
| Drugs.com = 
| MedlinePlus = a695017
| pregnancy_US = D
| legal_status = Rx Only
| routes_of_administration = Intravenous

| bioavailability = complete
| protein_bound = Very low
| metabolism =
| elimination_half-life = 1.1-2 hours
| excretion = renal

| CAS_number_Ref = 
| CAS_number = 41575-94-4
| ATC_prefix = L01
| ATC_suffix = XA02
| ATC_supplemental =
| PubChem = 498142
| DrugBank_Ref = 
| DrugBank = DB00958
| ChemSpiderID_Ref = 
| ChemSpiderID = 8514637
| UNII_Ref = 
| UNII = BG3F62OND5
| KEGG_Ref = 
| KEGG = D01363
| ChEBI_Ref = 
| ChEBI = 31355
| ChEMBL_Ref = 
| ChEMBL = 288376

| C=6 | H=12 | N=2 | O=4 | Pt=1
| smiles = C1CC2(C1)C(=O)O[Pt-2]([NH3+])([NH3+])OC2=O
| StdInChI_Ref = 
| StdInChI = 1S/C6H8O4.2H3N.Pt/c7-4(8)6(5(9)10)2-1-3-6;;;/h1-3H2,(H,7,8)(H,9,10);2*1H3;/q;;;+2/p-2
| StdInChIKey_Ref = 
| StdInChIKey = OLESAACUTLOWQZ-UHFFFAOYSA-L
}}Carboplatin, sold under the trade name Paraplatin''' among others, is a chemotherapy medication used to treat a number of forms of cancer. This includes ovarian cancer, lung cancer, head and neck cancer, brain cancer, and neuroblastoma. It is used by injection into a vein.

Side effects generally occur. Common side effects include low blood cell levels, nausea, and electrolyte problems. Other serious side effects include allergic reactions and increased future risk of another cancer. Use during pregnancy may result in harm to the baby. Carboplatin is in the platinum-based antineoplastic family of medications and works by interfering with duplication of DNA.

Carboplatin was patented in 1972 and approved for medical use in 1989. It is on the World Health Organization's List of Essential Medicines.

Medical uses
Carboplatin is used to treat a number of forms of cancer. This includes ovarian cancer, lung cancer, head and neck cancer, brain cancer, and neuroblastoma. It may be used for some types of testicular cancer but cisplatin is generally more effective.  It has also been used to treat triple-negative breast cancer.

Side effects
Relative to cisplatin, the greatest benefit of carboplatin is its reduced side effects, particularly the elimination of nephrotoxic effects. Nausea and vomiting are less severe and more easily controlled.

The main drawback of carboplatin is its myelosuppressive effect. This causes the blood cell and platelet output of bone marrow in the body to decrease quite dramatically, sometimes as low as 10% of its usual production levels. The nadir of this myelosuppression usually occurs 21–28 days after the first treatment, after which the blood cell and platelet levels in the blood begin to stabilize, often coming close to its pre-carboplatin levels. This decrease in white blood cells (neutropenia) can cause complications, and is sometimes treated with drugs like filgrastim. The most notable complication of neutropenia is increased probability of infection by opportunistic organisms, which necessitates hospital readmission and treatment with antibiotics.

Chemistry
In terms of its structure, carboplatin differs from cisplatin in that it has a bidentate dicarboxylate (the ligand is CycloButane DiCarboxylic Acid, CBDCA) in place of the two chloride ligands, which are the leaving groups in cisplatin. For this reason, "CBDCA" is sometimes used in the medical literature as an abbreviation referring to carboplatin. Carboplatin exhibits lower reactivity and slower DNA binding kinetics, although it forms the same reaction products in vitro'' at equivalent doses with cisplatin. Unlike cisplatin, carboplatin may be susceptible to alternative mechanisms. Some results show that cisplatin and carboplatin cause different morphological changes in MCF-7 cell lines while exerting their cytotoxic behaviour. The diminished reactivity limits protein-carboplatin complexes, which are excreted. The lower excretion rate of carboplatin means that more is retained in the body, and hence its effects are longer lasting (a retention half-life of 30 hours for carboplatin, compared to 1.5-3.6 hours in the case of cisplatin).

Mechanism of action
Two theories exist to explain the molecular mechanism of action of carboplatin with DNA:
Aquation, or the like-cisplatin hypothesis.
Activation, or the unlike-cisplatin hypothesis.
The former is more accepted owing to the similarity of the leaving groups with its predecessor cisplatin, while the latter hypothesis envisages a biological activation mechanism to release the active Pt2+ species.

Dose
Calvert's formula is used to calculate the dose of carboplatin. It takes under consideration the creatinine clearance and the desired area under curve. After 24 hours, close to 70% of carboplatin is excreted in the urine unchanged. This means that the dose of carboplatin must be adjusted for any impairment in kidney function.

Calvert formula: 

The typical area under the curve (AUC) for carboplatin ranges from 3-7 (mg/ml)*min.

History
Carboplatin was discovered at Michigan State University, and developed at the Institute of Cancer Research in London. Bristol-Myers Squibb gained Food and Drug Administration (FDA) approval for carboplatin, under the brand name Paraplatin, in March 1989. Starting in October 2004, generic versions of the drug became available.

Research
Carboplatin has also been used for adjuvant therapy of stage 1 seminomatous testicular cancer. Research has indicated that it is not less effective than adjuvant radiotherapy for this treatment, while having fewer side effects. This has led to carboplatin based adjuvant therapy being generally preferred over adjuvant radiotherapy in clinical practice.

Carboplatin combined with hexadecyl chain and polyethylene glycol appears to have increased liposolubility and PEGylation. This is useful in chemotherapy, specifically non-small cell lung cancer.

See also
Cisplatin
Dicycloplatin

References

Additional references

External links

Creatinine Clearence [sic] Calculator
 

Ammine complexes
Coordination complexes
Cyclobutanes
Organoplatinum compounds
Platinum(II) compounds
Platinum-based antineoplastic agents
Wikipedia medicine articles ready to translate
World Health Organization essential medicines